Germán Gustavo Herrera (born 19 July 1983 in Granadero Baigorria, Santa Fe) is an Argentine retired forward.

Club career
Herrera played for Real Sociedad in 2006/07, before moving to San Lorenzo de Almagro, but only made two appearances for them before joining Gimnasia y Esgrima de La Plata. He then moved to Brazil to play for Corinthians and Grêmio, and for the 2010 season he joined Botafogo.

In July 2012, he signed a contract with the UAE side Emirates Club.

On 9 April 2019, Herrera announced his retirement from football.

International career
Herrera also has 12 caps for the Argentina Under-20 team and has scored 4 goals.

Honours
 Grêmio
 Campeonato Gaúcho: 2006

 Corinthians
 Campeonato Brasileiro Série B: 2008 Campeonato Brasileiro Série B

 Botafogo
 Campeonato Carioca: 2010
 Taça Guanabara: 2010
 Taça Rio: 2010, 2012

Rosario Central
Copa Argentina: 2017–18

Other campaigns
 Argentina national football team
FIFA U-20 World Cup: 2003 4th place
 Corinthians
Brazilian Cup: 2008 runner-up
 Emirates Club
UAE Division 1 Group A: 2012-13 champions

References

External links

Living people
1983 births
Argentine footballers
Argentina under-20 international footballers
Grêmio Foot-Ball Porto Alegrense players
Sport Club Corinthians Paulista players
Botafogo de Futebol e Regatas players
CR Vasco da Gama players
Rosario Central footballers
San Lorenzo de Almagro footballers
Club de Gimnasia y Esgrima La Plata footballers
Real Sociedad footballers
Emirates Club players
Footballers from Santa Fe, Argentina
La Liga players
Campeonato Brasileiro Série A players
Campeonato Brasileiro Série B players
Expatriate footballers in Brazil
Expatriate footballers in the United Arab Emirates
Argentine expatriate footballers
Argentine Primera División players
Argentine expatriate sportspeople in Brazil
Argentine expatriate sportspeople in Spain
Argentine expatriate sportspeople in the United Arab Emirates
Association football forwards
UAE Pro League players
UAE First Division League players